Belinsky is a 1953 Soviet biopic film directed by Grigori Kozintsev, based on the life of Russian literary critic Vissarion Belinsky (1811–1848). The production of the film was completed in 1951 but it was not released until 1953, following the reshooting of various scenes demanded by Stalin.

Cast
 Sergei Kurilov as Vissarion Belinsky
 Aleksandr Borisov as Alexander Herzen
 Georgy Vitsin as Nikolai Gogol
 Yuri Lyubimov as Frolov
 Yuri Tolubeyev as Mikhail Shchepkin
 Vladimir Chestnokov as Nikolay Nekrasov
 Mikhail Nazvanov as Nicholas I
 Igor Gorbachyov as student
 Arkadi Trusov as sergeant
 Nikolay Simonov as landlord
 Olga Aroseva as actress
 Nikolay Trofimov as typographic worker
 Bruno Freindlich as Professor Shcheplovidov

References

External links

1953 films
1950s biographical drama films
Soviet biographical drama films
Russian biographical drama films
Lenfilm films
Soviet black-and-white films
Films directed by Grigori Kozintsev
Films scored by Dmitri Shostakovich
Films set in the 19th century
Russian black-and-white films
Cultural depictions of Nicholas I of Russia
1950s Russian-language films